The women's competition in the super heavyweight (+ 75 kg) division was held on 12–13 November 2011.

Schedule

Medalists

Records

Results

New records

References

(Pages 53, 59 & 61) Start List 
2011 IWF World Championships Results Book Pages 26–28 
Results

2011 World Weightlifting Championships
World